The Duchy of Głogów or Duchy of Glogau was one of the Duchies of Silesia ruled by the Silesian Piasts. Its capital was Głogów in Lower Silesia.

History
In 1177, under the rule of Konrad Spindleshanks, the youngest son of High Duke Władysław II the Exile of Poland, the town of Głogów had already become the capital of a duchy in its own right. However, when Konrad died between 1180 and 1190, his duchy was again inherited by his elder brother Bolesław I the Tall, Duke of Wrocław. After the death of Bolesław's grandson Duke Henry II the Pious at the 1241 Battle of Legnica his sons in 1248 divided the Lower Silesian Duchy of Wrocław among themselves. Konrad I, a child when his father died, claimed his rights too and in 1251 and received the northern Głogów territory from his elder brother Bolesław II the Bald, then Duke of Legnica.

Under the rule of Konrad's son Henry III the principality became smaller, as fragmentation and division continued, and other, smaller duchies were split from it like Ścinawa (Steinau, Stínava) and Żagań (Sagan, Zaháň) in 1273 as well as the duchies of Oleśnica (Oels, Olešnice) and Wołów (Wohlau, Volov) in 1312. After Henry's son Przemko II had died without heirs in 1331, King John the Blind was able to seize the duchy as a fiefdom of the Kingdom of Bohemia and granted it to the Piast Duke Henry I of Jawor six years later. As Henry I left no issue, King John's son, Charles IV incorporated one half of Głogów into Crown of Bohemia, granting the remaining half to Duke Henry V of Iron of Żagań in 1349.

When in 1476 the Głogów line of the Piast dynasty became extinct with the death of Henry XI, fights over his succession broke out between his cousin Duke Jan II the Mad of Żagań and Elector Albert III Achilles of Brandenburg, the father of Henry's widow Barbara of Brandenburg. In consequence the duchy's northern part of Krosno Odrzańskie (Crossen an der Oder) was incorporated by the Margraviate of Brandenburg in 1482. The truce however was broken by Duke Jan II, who continued his attacks on the neighbouring territories and in 1480 even invaded the royal Bohemian half of the Głogów duchy. This action finally brought the Bohemian antiking Matthias Corvinus to the scene, who in 1488 conquered Głogów, deposed Jan II and made his son János the duke.

Upon Matthias' death in 1490 his territories were reacquired by Bohemian king Vladislaus II Jagiellon, who granted the fief of Głogów to his brothers John I Albert in 1491 and later Sigismund I the Old in 1499, both future kings of Poland. In 1506 the duchy finally became an immediate dominion of the Bohemian Crown, which, after Vladislaus' son Louis II Jagiellon had died in 1526, were inherited by Archduke Ferdinand I of Austria and became part of the Habsburg monarchy.

Głogów remained part of the Crown of Bohemia within the province of Silesia until the end of the First Silesian War in 1742 when, like the majority of Silesia, it became part of Frederick the Great's Kingdom of Prussia (which was definitively confirmed by the Treaty of Aachen in 1748). Even the Seven Years' War did not change this status. In 1815 the Duchy (along with other Silesian duchies) ceased to exist due to radical administrative reform. All of Silesia was unified into a single administrative unit, Province of Silesia (Provinz Schlesien).

Finally, after World War II the territories of Prussian Silesia east of the Oder-Neisse line were granted to Poland by the Allied Powers under the Potsdam Agreement.

Dukes of Głogów 
 1177-1180: Konrad Spindleshanks
Again part of the Duchy of Wrocław, from 1248 on part of Legnica
 1251 (1241?)-1274: Konrad I
 1274-1309: Henry III, son
 1309-1331: Przemko II, son

Duchy vassalized by the Kingdom of Bohemia
 1337-1346 Henry I of Jawor

Annexed by Bohemia, one half to Duchy of Żagań (1349), ruled by:
 1349-1369: Henry V of Iron, Duke of Głogów and Żagań
 1369-1393: Henry VI the Older, son, jointly with his brothers
 1369-1395: Henry VII Rumpold
 1369-1378: Henry VIII the Sparrow
 1395-1397: Henry VIII the Sparrow (alone)
 1397-1401: Rupert I of Legnica, regent for
 1397-1412: Jan I of Żagań, son of Henry VIII, jointly with his brothers
 1397-1467: Henry IX the Older
 1397-1417: Wenceslaus of Krosno
 1397-1423: Henry X Rumpold
 1467-1476: Henry XI, son of Henry IX
Line  extinct, whole duchy directly under the Crown of Bohemia 
 1476-1488 Jan II the Mad of Żagań
1482: Northern part sold to Brandenburg 
 1488-1490: János Corvinus as Jan II, Duke of Głogów
 1491-1498:  hold in pledge by John I Albert of Poland
 1499-1506: hold in pledge by Sigismund I the Old

See also 
 Dukes of Silesia
 Silesia Walls of the Duchy of Głogów

Duchies of Silesia
States and territories established in 1177
States and territories disestablished in 1742